Nebojša Vignjević (born 15 May 1968) is a Serbian football manager and former player.

Playing career
Vignjević came through the youth system of Partizan, but failed to make any first-team appearances. He started his senior career at lower league club Rakovica, before moving to Yugoslav First League side Rad in the early 1990s. Later on, Vignjević spent some time with the Toronto Lynx of the USL A-League. He also played professionally in Hungary in the early 2000s.

Managerial career
After hanging up his boots, Vignjević started working with the youth teams of Rad. He began his managerial career at BSK Borča in 2004, before returning to Rad. In June 2006, Vignjević took charge of Serbian First League club Radnički Pirot.

Between 2009 and 2011, Vignjević spent two seasons as manager of Montenegrin side Rudar Pljevlja, winning one Montenegrin First League title (2010) and back-to-back Montenegrin Cups (2010 and 2011).

On 23 October 2013, Vignjević was appointed as manager of Hungarian club Újpest. He led the team to two Magyar Kupa trophies (2014 and 2018). On 1 June 2020, Vignjević was dismissed from his position due to poor results.

Personal life
Vignjević is the older brother of fellow former footballer Nikola Vignjević. They played indoor soccer together for National Professional Soccer League team Edmonton Drillers in the 1999–2000 season.

Career statistics

Honours
Rudar Pljevlja
 Montenegrin First League: 2009–10
 Montenegrin Cup: 2009–10, 2010–11
Újpest
 Magyar Kupa: 2013–14, 2017–18
 Szuperkupa: 2014

References

External links
 
 

1968 births
Living people
Footballers from Belgrade
Yugoslav footballers
Serbia and Montenegro footballers
Serbian footballers
Association football midfielders
FK Rad players
Enosis Neon Paralimni FC players
Edmonton Drillers (1996–2000) players
Toronto Lynx players
FC Tatabánya players
Yugoslav First League players
First League of Serbia and Montenegro players
Cypriot First Division players
National Professional Soccer League (1984–2001) players
Nemzeti Bajnokság I players
Serbia and Montenegro expatriate footballers
Expatriate footballers in Cyprus
Expatriate footballers in Hungary
Expatriate soccer players in Canada
Serbia and Montenegro expatriate sportspeople in Cyprus
Serbia and Montenegro expatriate sportspeople in Hungary
Serbian football managers
FK BSK Borča managers
FK Radnički Pirot managers
FK Rad managers
OFK Grbalj managers
FK Rudar Pljevlja managers
FK Hajduk Kula managers
FK Vojvodina managers
Újpest FC managers
FK Liepāja managers
Budapest Honvéd FC managers
Al Dhafra FC managers
Serbian SuperLiga managers
Nemzeti Bajnokság I managers
Latvian Higher League managers
Serbian expatriate football managers
Expatriate football managers in Montenegro
Expatriate football managers in Hungary
Expatriate football managers in Latvia
Expatriate football managers in the United Arab Emirates
Serbian expatriate sportspeople in Montenegro
Serbian expatriate sportspeople in Hungary
Serbian expatriate sportspeople in Latvia
Serbian expatriate sportspeople in the United Arab Emirates